Baritosis is a benign type of pneumoconiosis, which is caused by long-term exposure to barium dust.

Barium has a high radio-opacity and the disease may develop after few months of exposure. Extremely dense, discrete small opacities of 2–4 mm diameter, sometimes of a star-like configuration, are seen on the radiograph. Their distribution is uniform. When they are very numerous, superimposition may give the impression of confluency, but this does not seem to occur in reality. The hilar lymph nodes can be very opaque but not enlarged. After cessation of exposure, there is a gradual clearing of the opacities.

Symptoms and signs
 Cough
 Wheezing
 Nasal irritation

In some cases, it is asymptomatic.

Diagnosis
The barium particles can be seen as opaque shadows on the chest X-rays of people with baritosis.  However, being a benign condition, it neither interferes with lung function nor causes symptoms other than a mild cough.  

After exposure to barium dust ceases, the X-ray abnormalities gradually resolve.

Treatment
Once diagnosis has been confirmed, the most effective treatment is to eliminate exposure to barium dust. When a persistent cough is present, expectorants may be prescribed to help cough out the sputum and barium particles. Cough suppressants and/or NSAIDS may be used to help reduce irritation and inflammation.

Reference

 http://www.wrongdiagnosis.com/b/baritosis/intro.htm
 https://www.epainassist.com/chest-pain/lungs/baritosis

External links 

Occupational diseases
Lung disorders
Barium
Pulmonology
Respiratory diseases
Toxic effects of metals
Toxicology